Ryan Paul Slattery is an American film and television actor, writer, producer, and director.  Slattery is most notable for his work in the MGM film Sleepover as Peter, the kind-hearted boy who befriends Yancy, played by Kallie Flynn Childress.

Early life and education
Slattery was born in Ventura, California, and attended Shadow Mountain High School in Phoenix, Arizona, where he played baseball.

He went on to attend Harvard University, where he received his bachelor's degree in Dramatic Arts and Film Studies, and the renowned UCLA Film School, earning a Master of Fine Arts degree in the UCLA Producers Program.

Film and television career
Slattery is best known as an actor, with credits in film and television including the MGM film Sleepover, and television series including The Jersey on the Disney Channel, The District on CBS, American Dreams on NBC, JAG on CBS, and MTV's Undressed on MTV.

He was nominated for a Young Artist Award (Best Performance in a Feature Film, Young Ensemble Cast) for his role as Peter in the film Sleepover.

Slattery is also a film and television writer, producer, and director.  His film Playtime (Spielzeit) premiered at the 2012 Sundance Film Festival.

His directorial debut, At Ease, about the US Military's controversial Don't Ask, Don't Tell policy, was released on October 21, 2010, and has received positive reviews.

Personal life
After the events of September 11th, 2001, Slattery donated his salary from the television show JAG to victims.

Slattery was a contestant on the April 24, 2007 episode on Wheel of Fortune, in which he was the big winner winning $41,850, including the bonus round.

Slattery was an intern on Capitol Hill for a United States Congressman.

He is also a Private Pilot, licensed for fixed wing aircraft.

Filmography

References

External links

Playtime (Spielzeit) Film Website

1982 births
American male child actors
American male film actors
Harvard Extension School alumni
Harvard University alumni
UCLA Film School alumni
Living people